Mono Band is Noel Hogan's side project from The Cranberries. The Remixes EP was released on iTunes and various other online music stores.

Digital download track listing
From Yahoo Music.
"Miss P" (Steve Hillier mix)
"Brighter Sky" (Steve Hillier mix)
"Brighter" Sky (Lovesky mix)
"Miss P" (Ming (DJ) & FS remix)
"Brighter Sky" (Ming (DJ) & FS remix)
"Brighter Sky" (Ming (DJ) & FS extended club remix)
"Brighter Sky" (dub)
"Invitation" (Viva dance mix)
"Invitation" (Viva vocal mix)

12" vinyl track listing
From Gohan Records.
"Miss P" (Steve Hillier mix)
"Brighter Sky" (Steve Hillier mix)
"Brighter Sky" (Lovesky mix)
"Brighter Sky" (Marius De Vries Mix)

Band members
Noel Hogan - guitar, programming, backing vocals
Soname Yangchen - lead vocals (2, 3, 5, 6, 7)
Alexandra Hamnede - lead vocals (1, 4)
Kate Havnevik - lead vocals (8, 9)
Marius De Vries - additional keyboards & programming (2, 3, 5, 6, 7)

References

2005 EPs
Mono Band albums
2005 remix albums
Remix EPs